Rugby Clube de Montemor is a rugby union team based in Montemor-o-Novo, Portugal. The team competes in the Campeonato Português de Rugby - Divisão de Honra, the first tier of rugby union in Portugal, after winning Campeonato Nacional de Rugby I Divisão, in the season 2018/2019.

Founded on 20 July 1995, Montemor is the most successful rugby club in Alentejo, with over 15 trophies in the last 20 years. Since 2007, their home ground has been the Parque Desportivo, Montemor-o-Novo.

Honours

 Campeonato Nacional de Rugby I Divisão
 Winners (3): 2012/2013, 2015/2016, 2018/2019

 Campeonato Português de Rugby - Divisão de Honra Under-18
 Winners: 2015/2016

 Portuguese Cup Under-18
 Winners: 2014/2015

 Iberian Cup Under-18
 Winners: 2016/2017

 Portuguese Super Cup Under-18 
 Winners: 2015/2016

External links
 Official Club Page

Portuguese rugby union teams